I Don't Like Mondays. (IDLMs.) is a Japanese rock band based in Tokyo. They are signed with Rhythm Zone, an imprint of Avex Group.

Overview

Origin of the band name
The band name "I Don't Like Mondays." was named because the members liked the idea of using a sentence. The band has stated that they truly dislike Mondays, and they consider it to be a weekly holiday.

Production style
They started out making music by holding sessions, but now they've found that discussion is the best way to produce music. If one of the four members is not satisfied with the production, that track will not be released.

Self-producing
They produce not only music but also direct live shows and music videos by themselves. 
The band is active in the fashion industry, such as co-producing with "RESTIR", a Japanese fashion brand/boutique.

Band members

History
The band was formed in 2012, in Omotesando, Tokyo. Their first album PLAY was released in 2014, with the band playing a number of festivals the same year, including Tokyo Crazy Kawaii Taipei and J-Music LAB 2014 in Hai Day.

The band launched a fashion brand on 12 February named IDLMs. That same year they released their first self-directed single "WE ARE YOUNG"/"Super Special" which was selected as one of Japan's best singles of the year, by Keisuke Kuwata. The bands second album TOKYO was released on 29 July 2015. The band also produced a single titled THE INDEPENDENT, which was used for Leslie Kee's short film YOHJI YAMAMOTO. The band released their third album FASHION on September 28, 2016. Google Play Music in Japan used a 'Freaky Boy' from the album in their advertisements.

In 2017 the band released an E.P titled SUMMER, the track Shape of Love was used to promote H&M's first original campaign (Happy Golden Week) in Japan. In 2019 their fourth album FUTURE was released, followed by BLACK HUMOUR in 2021.

The band wrote "PAINT", which was used for the opening of the One Piece anime.

Other activities

Fashion
Launched an original brand "IDLMs by I Don't Like Mondays.". After the launch, they have collaborated with a Japanese original brand shop "And A" and started a collaborated brand called "And A by "I Don't Like Mondays.". In September 2016, they have announced to collaborate with a select apparel shop"RESTIR" and launched "IDLMs. CREATIVE DRECTION BY RESTIR EDITION".

They performed at a fashion show of Kansai Yamamoto. In 2015, they did a music direction for the short film called "THE INDEPENDENTS" Directed by LESLIE KEE Time 12:34 featuring YOHJI YAMAMOTO 2015 A/W Collections and they also performed in the film. One of their tracks"Shape of Love" was selected for H&M's sales campaign called "Happy Golden Week" which was H&M's first Japan original campaign. They also performed in the promotional movie for this campaign shot by Leslie Kee.

Live

Discography

Single

Album

E.P.

External links 
 I Don't Like Mondays. Official Site

References

Japanese rock music groups
Nippon Columbia artists